Zhu Huiling (Chinese: (朱慧玲; born 1982 in Shanghai) is a Chinese mezzo-soprano opera singer. She won 2nd prize at the 2005 Klaudia Taev Competition in Estonia. She has appeared as Maddalena in Rigoletto in Shanghai, as Carmen in Estonia, and in a ballet to Grieg's Peer Gynt for Ballett Zürich which was released on DVD.

References

21st-century Chinese women opera singers
Chinese mezzo-sopranos
1982 births
Living people